Sam Musenze  is a Uganda football defender who played for Uganda in the 1978 African Cup of Nations.

Musenze also represented Uganda in 1978 World Cup qualifiers.

External links
 11v11 Profile

References

Ugandan footballers
Association football defenders
Living people
Year of birth missing (living people)
Uganda international footballers